Aaron and Jordan Kandell (both born June 16, 1982) are identical twin American screenwriters and journalists. They were born and raised in Honolulu, Hawaii and studied film and creative writing at the University of Southern California. They have written numerous original feature film and television projects for Fox Animation, Disney Animation, Warner Brothers Pictures, 20th Century Fox, Legendary and Paramount Pictures. The Kandell brothers were on the 2013 Young and Hungry List and their screenplay The Golden Record was on the 2013 Black List. They also served as screenwriters on Disney Animation's Moana.

The Kandells wrote the spec script that was turned into the film Adrift (2018), directed by Baltasar Kormákur and starring Shailene Woodley.

Films 
 Happiest Man Alive (2010), writers
 Moana (2016), writers for Disney Animation
 Adrift (2018), writers (also producers)
 Untitled Fox Animation Project (in development), writers for Fox Animation
 Sidekicks (in development), writers for Paramount Pictures
 Aladdin (in development), writers for Warner Brothers
 The Golden Record (in development), writers for Endgame Entertainment
 Stranded (in development), writers for Walt Disney Studios

References 

American screenwriters
1982 births
University of Southern California alumni
Living people
Walt Disney Animation Studios people